Dale Hilson (born 23 December 1992, in Stirling) is a Scottish footballer who plays as a striker for Arbroath, having previously played for Dundee United, Forfar Athletic, Queen of the South and St Mirren.

Career
Hilson, who had featured a handful of times for the Terrors Under-19s, debuted in October 2009 as a substitute in the Scottish Premier League match versus Hamilton Academical. Hilson won the Under-19 Scottish Premier League player of the season for 2009–10.

In August 2010, Hilson then joined Forfar Athletic on loan, scoring on his league debut and was again loaned out to the Sky Blues in 2012. On 28 April 2012, Hilson was sent-off for foul and abusive language. In December 2012, Hilson started a third loan spell at Station Park and then in August 2013, he returned for a fourth loan spell, joining until the end of January 2014. The loan deal was then extended until the end of the season, as he finished joint-top goalscorer with Gavin Swankie with 13 goals. During his fourth loan spell, Hilson made his 100th appearance for the Loons, making 113 appearances in total during his time at the club.

On 4 June 2014, Hilson was released by the Tannadice club at the end of his contract and then on 3 July 2014, signed for the Sky Blues on a permanent contract.

In June 2015, Hilson then signed for Scottish Championship club Queen of the South. Hilson's contract at the Doonhamers was not renewed in May 2017 having made 38 appearances and scoring seven goals in all competitions during his two seasons with the club.

On 27 June 2017, Hilson signed a six-month contract with St Mirren, after successfully spending a week on trial to prove his fitness. On 30 September 2017, Hilson scored his only goal for the club in a 2–1 win versus Brechin City and was then released when his contract expired at the end of the year. On 1 January 2018, Hilson returned to Station Park, signing an 18-month contract with the Loons for his sixth spell with the club.
On 18 January 2020, Hilson signed for Arbroath.

Career statistics

References

External links
 

1992 births
Living people
Footballers from Stirling
Scottish footballers
Scottish Premier League players
Scottish Football League players
Dundee United F.C. players
Forfar Athletic F.C. players
Queen of the South F.C. players
St Mirren F.C. players
Association football forwards
Scottish Professional Football League players
Arbroath F.C. players